Motilibacter peucedani is a Gram-positive, aerobic and motile bacterium from the genus of Motilibacter which has been isolated from rhizosphere soil of the plant Peucedanum japonicum from Mara Island in Korea.

References

Bacteria described in 2012
Actinomycetota